Rutland Water is a reservoir in Rutland, England, east of Rutland's county town, Oakham. It is filled by pumping from the River Nene and River Welland, and provides water to the East Midlands. By surface area it is the largest reservoir in England, but its capacity is exceeded by that of Kielder Water in Northumberland. Its maximum depth is 33m (108 ft). 

Since the water is drawn upon when needed, the relative areas of land and water vary a little, but the flatter parts of the lake margin are enclosed by banks so that the wetland nature reserve is maintained.

A 1,555 hectare area of lake and shore is a biological Site of Special Scientific Interest, and Nature Conservation Review site. An area of 1,333 hectares is a Ramsar internationally important wetland site, and 393 hectares at the western end is managed by the Leicestershire and Rutland Wildlife Trust.

Construction
The reservoir's construction, by damming the Gwash valley near Empingham, was completed in 1975. During its construction it was known as Empingham Reservoir. It flooded six or seven square kilometres of the Gwash valley as well as the side valley, at the head of which lies Oakham. Nether Hambleton and most of Middle Hambleton were demolished and their wells were plugged as part of the ground preparation. Their neighbouring village of Upper Hambleton survived, and now sits on the Hambleton Peninsula. The Gwash makes a net input to the lake but its flow downstream is maintained.

Because much of the valley is clay, material for the dam was extracted from pits dug within the area that would be subsequently flooded.

Rutland Water contains a limnological tower for study of the reservoir's ecological conditions.

Community
Upper Hambleton and the remnant of Middle Hambleton, including the Old Hall, are together now known simply as Hambleton and are to be found on a long peninsula in the middle of the lake, land that was formerly a ridge between the two valleys in which the lake now lies. The few houses of Normanton avoided flooding although its church did not. The lower part of the building was supported against water damage so that its upper part could be used to present the story of the construction of the reservoir to the public. Some funerary monuments from it can be seen at Edenham church, Lincolnshire.

Recreation
The reservoir is used not just for water storage, but is a popular sports centre – as well as water sports such as sailing visitors enjoy fishing, walking and cycling along a  perimeter track. A pleasure cruiser, the Rutland Belle, carries people around the lake. Birdwatching brings visitors from far afield. The former butterfly centre at Sykes Lane has been turned into Bugtopia – The Zoo.

Wildlife
Large areas of wetland (as well as several small woods) at the western end of the lake form a nature reserve, managed by Leicestershire and Rutland Wildlife Trust. The area is designated a Special Protection Area of international importance for its wintering populations of gadwall (some 4% of this species’ European population) and shoveler. It is home to the Anglian Water Bird Watching Centre. Every August, the centre was the venue for the British Birdwatching Fair until 2019. Other birds found here include lapwing, coot, goldeneye, tufted duck, pochard, teal, wigeon, cormorant, great crested grebe, little grebe and, most notably, osprey, which were re-introduced to the area during 1996, including one called "Mr Rutland".  In 2021 there were 26 ospreys in the area of Rutland Water.

The lake is stocked with brown trout and rainbow trout, but there is a large head of coarse fish populated by water pumped in from the River Welland and River Nene, species include roach, bream, pike, zander, perch, eel, wels catfish and carp.

Ichthyosaur
In early 2021 an ichthyosaur fossil was discovered during the routine draining of a lagoon at the reservoir. A Temnodontosaurus with a skeleton measuring about 10 metres in length and a skull weighing about a tonne, is the largest and most complete fossil of its kind found in the UK.

Visitor centres
The Anglian Water Birdwatching Centre, located in Egleton, features a gift shop operated by the Leicestershire and Rutland Wildlife Trust and a shop selling binoculars and telescopes. The centre includes the Rutland Environmental Education Centre, exhibits, and windows overlooking the wetlands.

The Lyndon Visitor Centre is located on the reserve's south shore. There are exhibits, bird viewing windows, trails and hides.

References

External links

Rutland Water Nature Reserve
Official Tourism Guide to Rutland Water
Special Protection Area data
Rutland Sailing Club
Images of Rutland Water
Image gallery of photos taken around Rutland Water

Leicestershire and Rutland Wildlife Trust
Nature Conservation Review sites
Ramsar sites in England
Reservoirs in Rutland
Sites of Special Scientific Interest in Rutland
Special Protection Areas in England
Drinking water reservoirs in England
Nature centres in England